Robert Carver may refer to:

 Robert Carver (composer) (c. 1485–c. 1570), Scottish Renaissance composer of Christian sacred music
 Robert Carver (painter) (1730–1791), Irish painter
 Bob Carver (fl. 1972–2013), audio electronics engineer

See also
 Robert Carter (disambiguation)